Peter Owen-Jones (born 1957) is an English Anglican priest, author and television presenter.

Owen-Jones dropped out of public school at the age of 16, and moved to Australia, where he worked as a farm hand. He moved back to Britain, and worked as a farm labourer in southeast England, then ran a mobile disco, before moving to London where he started work in advertising, as a messenger boy, eventually working his way up to the position of creative director.

In his late 20s, with a wife and two children, he gave up his commercial life to follow a calling to the Anglican ordained ministry by enrolling at Ridley Hall, Cambridge. In early 1996, he gained notoriety when he conducted a service for the Newbury bypass protestors.

In 1998, he was responsible for three parishes in Cambridgeshire as the rector of Haslingfield (Harlton, Great Eversden and Little Eversden), before resigning from this position in 2005 to relocate to the benefice of Glynde, West Firle and Beddingham. After a brief appearance in the 2003 documentary series The Power and the Glory, he was recruited by the BBC to front a series of religious television programmes looking at different aspects of Christianity and other faiths.

He was married to Jacs Owen-Jones, with whom he has four children, but they have divorced.

In his BBC documentary How to Live a Simple Life (2009), Owen-Jones tried to live a life without money in the footsteps of Saint Francis of Assisi. In the same year, he travelled the world in Around the World in 80 Faiths, visiting practitioners of various religions. His 2006 documentary The Lost Gospels discussed the Apocryphal Gospels which were omitted from the canon of the New Testament. He considered how their contents might have altered Christian theology if they had not been suppressed.

Books
 Bed of Nails: An Advertising Executive's Journey Through Theological College, Lion Hudson, 1998, 
 Small Boat, Big Sea: One Year's Journey as a Parish Priest, Lion Publishing, 2000, 
 Psalm, O Books, 2005, 
 Letters from an Extreme Pilgrim: Reflections on Life, Love and the Soul, Rider Books, 2010, 
 Pathlands: 21 Tranquil Walks Among the Villages of Britain,  Rider Books, 2015,

Audio
 Psalm, spoken word/electronica project

Filmography
 The Power and the Glory (2003), BBC Four
 The Battle for Britain's Soul (2004), BBC Two, a history of Christianity in Britain
 The Lost Gospels (2008), BBC Four, a documentary on the ancient gospels
 Extreme Pilgrim (2008), BBC Two, in which he lived as a Chinese Buddhist monk, a Christian monk and an Indian ascetic
 In Search of England's Green and Pleasant Land (2009): Episode: South, BBC South
 Around the World in 80 Faiths (2009), BBC Two, a travel documentary encountering different religions
 How to Live a Simple Life (2010), BBC Two, a three-part series in which he tries to turn his back on consumerism
 South Downs: England's Mountains Green (2017), BBC Four, looking at the history and culture of the South Downs National Park
 New Forest: A Year in the Wild Wood (2019), BBC Four, looking at the history and culture of the New Forest National Park

References

External links
 Sussex Life - Man on a Mission, January 2008
 The Guardian - My work space, 3 September 2005
 BBC - Around the World in 80 Faiths - An interview with Pete (Adobe Flash)

Living people
1957 births
Anglican clergy from London
Writers from London
Television people from London
21st-century English Anglican priests
English people of Scottish descent
British television presenters
British documentary filmmakers
English travel writers
English male non-fiction writers